The Fussball Club Basel 1893 1993–94 season was their 101st season since the club's foundation. Peter Epting was the club's chairman for the second period. FC Basel played their home games in the St. Jakob Stadium. Following their relegation in the 1987–88 season this was their sixth season in the second tier of Swiss football.

Overview

Pre-season
Claude Andrey was appointed as new first team trainer. He came from Sion where he had been trainer for the previous six months and he came as replacement for Friedel Rausch who had only been trainer with the club for the previous season. 

A number of players left the club during the off-season. Last season's top scorer André Sitek moved on to score his goals for Locarno, another goal scorer Frédéric Chassot returned to Neuchâtel Xamax after his loan period had expired and defender Dirk Lellek transferred to VfB Oldenburg. Christian Marcolli and Manfred Wagner both moved on to local rivals to Old Boys and Patrick Rahmen moved on to play for SR Delémont. In the other direction Swiss international goalkeeper Stefan Huber transferred in from Lausanne-Sport. Two new defender were also transferred in, Andre Meier from Chiasso and Samir Tabakovic from NK Belišće. The midfield was stregthend with the signings of Mario Cantaluppi from Grasshopper Club, Sergei Derkach from Dynamo Moscow and Didier Gigon from Lausanne-Sport. More notable transfers were those of Swiss international strikers Dario Zuffi and Philippe Hertig who both came from Lugano. A number of youngsters were brought up from the youth team including the hopeful local lads Markus Lichtsteiner and Roger Schreiber.

Domestic league
After missing promotion during the last five seasons, the club's repeated priority aim was to return to the top flight of Swiss football. There was to be a furher reform in the Swiss football league system and the number of teams in the Nationliga B to be reduced from 20 to 16. The 20 teams in the Nationalliga B were divided into two groups of 10, an East and a West group. In the first stage, both groups would play a qualification round. In the second stage, the top two teams in each Nationalliga B group would advance to the promotion round and the bottom eight teams in each group would play a relegation round. In the second stage the tops two teams of each group and the last four teams of the Nationalliga A would play a promotion/relegation round. The top four teams in this groups would play in the top flight the next season, the other four in the second flight. In the relegation round the remaining teams were divided into two groups of eight. In total seven teams would be relegated to the 1st League, the last three teams from each group plus one of both fifth placed teams.

Basel were assigned to the Nationalliga B West group, together with local rivals Old Boys and SR Delémont. Basel started somewhat sloppily into the season with two home defeats against Old Boys and Grenchen in the first three games of the season. But the newly formed team soon found themselves and they recorded eight victories in the next nine games. Etoile Carouge ended the qualifying phase as group winners, two points above second placed Basel. In the 18 games, Basel recorded 12 victories, one draw and five defeats with a goal difference of plus 25, 39 scored and 14 conceded. Dario Zuffi with 11 goals, Ørjan Berg with eight and Admir Smajić with six goals were the team's top goal scorers. Stefan Huber held a clean sheet in nine of his 17 matches during this first stage of the season.

As second placed team in their qualifying group, Basel qualified for the promotion stage. To help with their promotion attempt Axel Kruse was signed in on loan from VfB Stuttgart until the end of the season, but because of injuries he only played three league games. The other teams in this stage from the Nationalliga B were Etoile Carouge, St. Gallen and Schaffhausen. The bottom four teams from the Nationalliga A were Xamax, Zürich, Kriens and Yverdon-Sports. Basel's start in the phase of a somewhat slow stance and three draws in the first four matches and despite an away defeat against Xamax in round six they played well at the top of the group table. Not being defeated in the last eight matches, winning five, drawing three, they ended the group in first place. They were level on points with St. Gallen and Xamax and won promotion. Relegated this season from the top flight were Kriens and Yverdon-Sports. The team's top goal scorer was Dario Zuffi with 11 goals, five other players each scored two goals. Stefan Huber held a clean sheet in seven of his 13 matches during the second stage of the season.

Swiss Cup
Basel entered the Swiss Cup in the second round. Here they were drawn away from home in the Herti Allmend Stadion against lower-tier team Zug. Thomas Karrer and Ralph Steingruber put the guests 2–0 in front by half time and then in the second half they added even more pressure. In the second half they added another eight goals to final result 10–0. In the third round Basel were drawn at home in the St. Jakob Stadium against higher tier Aarau and despite being a goal down through an own goal at half time, Basel again turned up the pressure again in the second half and turned the result to win 4–1. In round four another higher tier team were to visit Basel in their home stadium. Dario Zuffi and Admir Smajić scored the goals as they won 2–0 against Lausanne-Sport. Round five gave higher tier Xamax the journey to St. Jakob Stadium and another Zuffi goal gave the host team a 1–0 victory. The fourth higher top flight team to make the visit to the stadium was Yverdon-Sports. The match was goalless after 90 minutes, thus went into over-time. Zuffi gave the hosts a 1–0 victory after extra time with a goal in 118th minute. 

The semi-final also gave Basel a home game against Schaffhausen, who had suffered a 3–0 defeat here exactly two weeks earlier. But this time the hosts played under capabilities, Schaffhausen played compact and kept the game goalless, even after extra time. The penalty shoot out was decisive. Schaffhausen goalkeeper Erich Hürzeler held striker Zuffi's attempt, Basel keeper Huber held Engesser's attempt and after 12 penalties things were level at five all. Keeper Hürzeler then held Tabakovic's attempt and so Steffen Ziffert's final penalty gave Schaffhausen the upset. Penalty sinner Tabakovic, the central defender from Bosnia, shed bitter tears. Schaffhausen advanced to the Swiss Cup final for only the second time in the club's history. Here they played Grasshopper Club, but the higher tier team proved their strength winning 4–0. It was GC's 18th Cup victory in their history.

Players 

 

 
 
 
 
 

 
 
 
 

 
 

 
 

 

Players who left the squad

Results 
Legend

Friendly matches

Pre- and mid-season

Winter break

Nationalliga B

Qualifying Phase

League table

Promotion/relegation Phase

League table

Swiss Cup

See also
 History of FC Basel
 List of FC Basel players
 List of FC Basel seasons

References

Sources
 Rotblau: Jahrbuch Saison 2015/2016. Publisher: FC Basel Marketing AG. 
 Die ersten 125 Jahre / 2018. Publisher: Josef Zindel im Friedrich Reinhardt Verlag, Basel. 
 The FCB squad 1993–94 at fcb-archiv.ch
 1993–94 at RSSSF

External links
 FC Basel official site

FC Basel seasons
Basel